Bousigonia is a genus of plants in the family Apocynaceae, first described as a genus in 1898. It is native to Indochina and southern China.

Species
 Bousigonia angustifolia Pierre ex Spire - Yunnan, Laos, Thailand, Vietnam
 Bousigonia mekongensis Pierre - Yunnan, Laos, Vietnam
 Bousigonia tonkinensis Eberh. - Vietnam

References

Apocynaceae genera
Rauvolfioideae